The 2013 Humboldt State Lumberjacks football team represented Humboldt State University during the 2013 NCAA Division II football season. Humboldt State competed in the Great Northwest Athletic Conference (GNAC).

The 2013 Lumberjacks were led by sixth-year head coach Rob Smith. They played home games at the Redwood Bowl in Arcata, California. Humboldt State finished the season winless, with a record of zero wins and eleven losses (0–11, 0–10 GNAC). The Lumberjacks were outscored by their opponents 170–354 for the 2013 season, with none of the losses coming by less than 7 points. This was the first time Humboldt State had been winless since the 1984 season.

Schedule

References

Humboldt State
Humboldt State Lumberjacks football seasons
College football winless seasons
Humboldt State Lumberjacks football